Klauber is a surname. Notable people with the surname include:

 Abraham Klauber (1831–1911), Czech-American businessman
 Adolph Klauber (1879–1933), American drama critic and producer
 Gertan Klauber (1932–2008), Czech-British character actor
 Laurence Monroe Klauber (1883–1968), American herpetologist
 Klauber (German engravers), a family of German artists

German-language surnames
Jewish surnames